Robert G. Roeder (born June 3, 1942, in Boonville, Indiana, United States) is an American biochemist. He is known as a pioneer scientist in eukaryotic transcription. He discovered three distinct nuclear RNA polymerases in 1969  and characterized many proteins involved in the regulation of transcription, including basic transcription factors and the first mammalian gene-specific activator over five decades of research. He is the recipient of the Gairdner Foundation International Award in 2000, the Albert Lasker Award for Basic Medical Research in 2003, and the Kyoto Prize in 2021. He currently serves as Arnold and Mabel Beckman Professor and Head of the Laboratory of Biochemical and Molecular Biology at The Rockefeller University.

Biography

Roeder was born in Boonville, Indiana, USA in 1942. He received his B.A. summa cum laude in chemistry from Wabash College and his M.S. in chemistry from the University of Illinois. He received his Ph.D. in biochemistry in 1969 from the University of Washington, Seattle, where he worked with William J. Rutter. He did postdoctoral work with Donald D. Brown at the Carnegie Institution of Washington, in Baltimore, from 1969 to 1971. He was a member of the faculty at Washington University School of Medicine in St. Louis from 1971 to 1982, when he joined The Rockefeller University. In 1985, he was named Arnold and Mabel Beckman Professor. He was elected as a member of the National Academy of Sciences in 1988 and the American Academy of Arts and Sciences in 1995, and a foreign associate member of the European Molecular Biology Organization in 2003.

Major discoveries

 1969–1977: In 1969, as a graduate student at the University of Washington, Roeder discovers that three enzymes, called RNA polymerases, directly copy DNA to RNA in animal cells. As a professor at Washington University in St. Louis, he goes on to show that these enzymes, referred to as Pol I, II and III, recognize and copy distinct classes of genes.
 1977-1979: Roeder develops cell-free systems to better study transcription. Composed of the purified RNA polymerases and components extracted from cell nuclei, the systems allow researchers to recreate transcription in a test tube in a way that faithfully mimics the real process in cells.
 1980: The development of cell-free systems leads to the identification of complex sets of proteins called accessory factors that are essential for each individual RNA polymerase (e.g., TFIIA, TFIIB, TFIIE, TFIIF and TFIIH for Pol II, and TFIIIB and TFIIIC for Pol III) to "read" specific target genes.
 1980: Roeder identifies the first mammalian gene-specific activator, called TFIIIA. TFIIIA and similar proteins bind to specific DNA sequences and enhance the reading of corresponding target genes. Repressors perform the opposite task by inhibiting a gene's activity.
 1990s: A decade of research culminates with the discovery of coactivators, large protein complexes that provide a bridge between the activators and repressors and the RNA polymerases and other components of the general transcription machinery.
1992: Roeder's laboratory demonstrates that coactivators can be ubiquitous, monitoring many genes in a variety of cells, or specific to one particular cell type. Roeder and colleagues introduce the concept of cell specificity after they demonstrate that the coactivator OCA-B, the first cell-specific coactivator, discovered by Roeder in 1992, is unique to immune system B cells.
1996: Roeder's laboratory discovers the major conduit for communication between gene-specific activators and the general transcription machinery in animal cells: a giant coactivator (TRAP/SMCC) that consists of about 25 different protein chains and is referred to as the human mediator after its counterpart in yeast.
2002: Roeder and colleagues show that a single component of the mediator is essential for the formation of fat cells — a finding that may one day contribute to new treatments for diabetes, heart disease, cancer and other conditions in which the fat-making process breaks down.

Highly cited papers
  Times Cited: 12,743
  Times Cited: 3,236
  Times Cited: 1,511
 Times Cited: 1,377
  Times Cited: 1,177

Honors and awards
 1977: American Chemical Society, Eli Lilly Award in Biological Chemistry
 1986: NAS Award in Molecular Biology
 1988: Member, National Academy of Sciences
 1988: Harvey Society Lecturer
 1990: Honorary Doctor of Science from Wabash College
 1992: Fellow, American Association for the Advancement of Science
 1995: Lewis S. Rosenstiel Award for Distinguished Work in Basic Medical Science (shared with Robert Tjian) 
 1995: Passano Award (shared with Robert Tjian) 
 1995: Fellow, American Academy of Arts and Sciences
 1999: Louisa Gross Horwitz Prize from Columbia University (shared with Pierre Chambon and Robert Tjian) 
 1999: General Motors Cancer Research Foundation's Alfred P. Sloan Prize (shared with Robert Tjian) 
 2000: Gairdner Foundation International Award (shared with Roger D. Kornberg) 
 2001: Dickson Prize in Medicine from University of Pittsburgh
 2002: Merck Award – American Society for Biochemistry and Molecular Biology (shared with Roger D. Kornberg) 
 2003: Albert Lasker Award for Basic Medical Research
 2003: Foreign Associate Member, European Molecular Biology Organization
 2005: Honorary Doctor of Science from Washington University in St. Louis
 2010: Salk Institute Medal for Research Excellence 
 2012: Albany Medical Center Prize in Medicine and Biomedical Research 
 2016: Herbert Tabor Research Award, American Society for Biochemistry and Molecular Biology
 2018: Howard Taylor Ricketts Award of the University of Chicago
 2019: Shitsan Pai International Award, the Biophysical Society of China 
 2021: Kyoto Prize

Prominent alumni of the Roeder Laboratory
The Roeder Laboratory has trained hundreds of students and postdoctoral fellows, many of whom hold independent positions in prominent biomedical research institutions, including Richard A. Bernstein (Northwestern University),  Robert B. Darnell (Rockefeller University and HHMI), Beverly M. Emerson (Salk Institute for Biological Studies), Michael R. Green (University of Massachusetts Medical School and HHMI), Wei Gu (Columbia University), Nathaniel Heintz (Rockefeller University and HHMI), Andrew B. Lassar (Harvard Medical School), Carl S. Parker (California Institute of Technology), Ron Prywes (Columbia University), Danny Reinberg (New York University School of Medicine and HHMI), Hazel L. Sive (Massachusetts Institute of Technology and Whitehead Institute) and Jerry Workman (Stowers Institute for Medical Research).

References

External links
Roeder Laboratory at The Rockefeller University
Dr. Roeder's publications

1942 births
21st-century American biologists
Members of the United States National Academy of Sciences
Fellows of the American Academy of Arts and Sciences
Living people
Wabash College alumni
University of Illinois alumni
University of Washington College of Arts and Sciences alumni
American medical researchers
Recipients of the Albert Lasker Award for Basic Medical Research
People from Boonville, Indiana
Kyoto laureates in Basic Sciences
Washington University School of Medicine faculty
Rockefeller University faculty